Tanveer Mashart Ul-Haq (born 3 December 1991) is an Indian cricketer. He made his first-class debut for Rajasthan in the 2014–15 Ranji Trophy on 5 January 2015. In January 2019, in the quarter-final match of the 2018–19 Ranji Trophy against Karnataka, Tanveer became the first bowler for Rajasthan to take 50 wickets in a single season. He finished the tournament with 51 wickets in ten matches.

In August 2019, he was named in the India Green team's squad for the 2019–20 Duleep Trophy.

References

External links
 

1991 births
Living people
Indian cricketers
Place of birth missing (living people)
Rajasthan cricketers